Hedda Matilda Stiernstedt (born December 3, 1987) is a Swedish actress. Born into the Stiernstedt family, she is the daughter of painter Jöran Modéer and teacher Metta Stiernstedt. Her breakthrough roles were as Nina Löwander in Vår tid är nu (2017–2021) and as Alice in Unga Sophie Bell (2015).

Life and career

Early life and career beginnings 
Stiernstedt was born December 3, 1987, in St. Göran's parish, Sweden. Her father Jöran Modéer, is a painter. Her mother, Baroness Metta Stiernstedt, is a teacher. A maternal ancestor, Erik Gustaf Gejier was a renowned Swedish writer, historian, poet, philosopher and composer. 

Stiernstedt attended Östra Real. 

In 2015, she played the leading role in the film Unga Sophie Bell. She also appears in the music video for the song "Addicted to You" by Avicii.

2017–2021: Vår tid är nu 
Since 2017, she has been cast in the role of Nina Löwander in the drama series Vår tid är nu (English title: The Restaurant), broadcast on SVT. In 2018, she won a Kristallen award in the category "Best actress in a TV drama", for her role as Nina.

Media image 
In 2020, Stiernstedt was awarded the honorary prize for being the best dressed woman in Sweden at Swedish Elle Magazine's Fashion Gala. She was also ranked in a survey conducted by Storytel as having the fourth hottest voice in Sweden.

Personal life

Family and relationships 
Stiernstedt revealed that she had planned to marry in the summer of 2020, but due to the COVID-19 pandemic, the wedding was postponed. The couple then married in secret during 2021 on the french countryside.

Filmography 

 2011 – Supernova (TV-series)
 2012 – Portkod 1321 (TV-series)
 2013 – Hot Chicks (shortfilm)
 2013 – Studentfesten (film)
 2013 – Wallander – Sveket (film)
 2013 – Monica Z (film)
 2013 – Den fördömde (TV-series)
 2014 – Kommissarien och havet (TV-series)
 2015 – Young Sophie Bell (film)
 2015 – Norskov (TV-series)
 2015 – 100 Code (TV-series)
 2015 – Eternal Summer (film)
 2016 – Pink Cloud syndrome (film)
 2017 – Vår tid är nu (TV-series)
 2018 - Black Lake - Svartsjön (TV series)
 2018 – Vår tid är nu season 2 (TV-series)
 2019 – Vår tid är nu season 3 (TV-series)
 2020 - Fjols til fjells (film)
 2020 – Min pappa Marianne (film)
 2020 – Se upp för Jönssonligan (film)
 2020 – Vår tid är nu season 4 (TV-series)
 2021 – Beforeigners season 2 (TV-series)
 2023 – One More Time (film)
 2023 – Fallen (TV-series)
 2023 – Börje Salming (TV-series)
 2024 – Boundless (film)

References

External links 

 

1987 births
Living people
Swedish film actresses
Swedish television actresses